Just right may refer to:

"Just right", a repeated observation by Goldilocks in "Goldilocks and the Three Bears"
Just Right, a breakfast cereal brand
Just Right (EP), by Got7, 2015
"Just Right", a song by Raheem DeVaughn, 2019

See also
Special Times Just Right (1997–2012), a prize-winning Bichon Frise
Volume III: Just Right, a 1992 album by Soul II Soul